Manny Matsakis (born Emmanouel M. Matsakis; April 16, 1962) is an American football coach and former player. He was most recently the head football coach at Defiance College, a position he held from 2018 to 2021. Matsakis has also served as the head football coach at Emporia State University from 1995 to 1998, at Texas State University in 2003, and at Bethany College in Lindsborg, Kansas from 2013 to 2014.

Playing career
Matsakis is a 1984 graduate of Capital University in Columbus, Ohio, where he was a four-year letter winner and a three-time First Team All-Ohio Athletic Conference selection as a kicker.  He still currently holds the school record for longest field goal, a 54-yarder in 1981.

Coaching career

Emporia State
Matsakis was the 19th head football coach for Emporia State University in Emporia, Kansas and he held that position for four seasons, from 1995 until 1998. His overall coaching record at Emporia State was 26–18.

Texas State 
Matsakis was head coach at Texas State in San Marcos, Texas, in 2003 but was fired in early 2004, along with the school's athletic director, after an investigation found NCAA violations within the program, including extra practice time above the limit. His overall coaching record at Texas State was 4–8.

Assistant coaching and high school 
During the mid 1990s, Matsakis served as an assistant coach at Hofstra University on Long Island.  In 1999, Matsakis served as the offensive coordinator at the University of Wyoming.  In 2000, he accepted the position of special teams coach at Texas Tech, where he coached until he became the head coach at Texas State for the 2003 season. Matsakis returned to Capital University when he was hired as the offensive coordinator for his alma mater on February 15, 2008, by new head coach Jim Bickel. Matsakis was hired by the Winnipeg Blue Bombers of the Canadian Football League (CFL) to replace the ill Andy Cox as their running backs coach two weeks into the 2009  season.

In 2010, Matsakis was hired to be the head coach at Enka High School in Candler, North Carolina where his teams compiled a 13–23 record before resigning in 2013.

Bethany
In March 2013, Matsakis was hired as the 17th head coach for the Bethany Swedes in Lindsborg, Kansas.  He remained there as head coach for the 2013 and 2014 seasons.

Widener
Matsakis spent the three years, 2015 to 2017, as the offensive coordinator at Widener University in Chester, Pennsylvania.

Defiance
In July 2018, Defiance College announced that it had selected Matsakis as head coach of the Yellow Jackets. In August 2021, he was fired from the program and was replaced by Earnest Wilson, who was appointed interim head coach.

Head coaching record

College

References

External links
 Defiance profile

1962 births
Living people
American football placekickers
Bethany Swedes football coaches
Capital Comets football coaches
Capital Comets football players
Defiance Yellow Jackets football coaches
Emporia State Hornets football coaches
Hofstra Pride football coaches
Kansas State Wildcats football coaches
Wyoming Cowboys football coaches
Texas State Bobcats football coaches
Texas Tech Red Raiders football coaches
Widener Pride football coaches
Winnipeg Blue Bombers coaches
High school football coaches in North Carolina
Kansas State University alumni
Sportspeople from New Britain, Connecticut
Players of American football from Connecticut
National Football League replacement players